The Defence  Research Agency (DRA) was an executive agency of the UK Ministry of Defence (MOD) from April 1991 until April 1995. At the time, the DRA was Britain's largest science and technology organisation. In April 1995, the DRA was combined with five other MOD establishments to form the Defence Evaluation and Research Agency.

History

The DRA was formed on 1 April 1991 as an amalgamation of the following Defence Research Establishments: 
Admiralty Research Establishment (ARE) – major sites Portsdown, Hampshire and Southwell, Dorset ("Maritime Division")
Royal Aircraft Establishment (RAE) – major site Farnborough, Hampshire ("Aerospace Division")
Aeroplane and Armament Experimental Establishment (A&AEE) – major site Boscombe Down
Royal Armament Research and Development Establishment (RARDE) – major site Fort Halstead, Kent ("Military Division")
Royal Signals and Radar Establishment (RSRE) – major site Malvern, Worcestershire ("Electronics Division")

DRA's headquarters was created at the RAE site at Farnborough, but the other major sites maintained a great deal of independence.

DRA's first Chief Executive was Nigel Hughes, followed by John Chisholm who took over in August 1991.

In April 1995, the DRA was combined with five other MOD establishments to form the Defence Evaluation and Research Agency (DERA), DRA's John Chisholm becoming Chief Executive of the enlarged DERA (split in July 2001 into DSTL and QinetiQ).

References

Bibliography
 Eds. Robert Bud and Philip Gummett (1999), Cold War Hot Science: Applied Research in Britain's Defence Laboratories 1945-1990, Harwood 

Military research of the United Kingdom
Defunct executive agencies of the United Kingdom government
Defence agencies of the United Kingdom
1991 establishments in the United Kingdom
1995 disestablishments in the United Kingdom
Government agencies established in 1991
Government agencies disestablished in 1995